Corner Pond Brook is a stream in the U.S. states of Connecticut and New York.

Corner Pond Brook was named for the fact four towns intersected at its watercourse.

References

Landforms of Putnam County, New York
Landforms of Fairfield County, Connecticut
Rivers of New York (state)
Rivers of Connecticut